Polar is a 2019 neo-noir action thriller film directed by Jonas Åkerlund and written by Jayson Rothwell, based on Víctor Santos's 2013 graphic novel Polar: Came From the Cold. The film stars Mads Mikkelsen, Vanessa Hudgens, Katheryn Winnick, and Matt Lucas. It revolves around an aging assassin on the verge of retirement who becomes targeted by an employer wanting to cash in on his pension.

Polar was released worldwide on Netflix on January 25, 2019. The film received negative reviews from critics.

Plot
At a remote location in Chile, Michael Green, a former employee of assassin organization Damocles, is killed by a specialist hit team consisting of Sindy the decoy, Facundo the sniper, and the assault team of Alexei, Karl, and Hilde.

Duncan Vizla, known as The Black Kaiser, is a Damocles employee nearing mandatory retirement on his fiftieth birthday. By making sizeable contributions to his company retirement fund, he is owed over $8 million upon his retirement day. Unknown to him, Mr Blut, owner of Damocles, plans to sell the company and is inflating its value by murdering its retiring operatives; thus acquiring all of their retirement fund by way of a clause in their contract.

Duncan lives in a remote town in Montana where he is gradually building a relationship with his new neighbor Camille. He is haunted by flashbacks of his murderous past and attempts to cultivate a normal life, to no avail. After giving an ill-fated talk at a local school about foreign countries and combat, he buys Camille a pistol and tries to teach her to shoot but she seems disturbed by the weapon.

Duncan is pressured into accepting a final contract by Vivian, a common associate of his and Blut's. He travels to Belarus to fulfil the mission where he finds it was a setup to have him killed. Returning to Montana, Duncan is hunted down by Facundo's team, via his accountant and several fake addresses. After stopping to help Sindy with an apparently broken down car, the pair return to his house where she entices him into sex, her normal mode of distracting the target. When the team engages for the kill, Duncan outmatches and kills them all except for Alexei, who activates "Plan B" and kidnaps Camille. Duncan discovers this from Alexei's girlfriend Junkie Jane and seeks the help of his old friend Porter, who instead betrays and drugs him.

Duncan awakens in Blut's mansion chained in place and is tortured for three days by Blut himself for killing Hilde, whom Blut was in a relationship with. At the same time, Camille is kept in a drug-induced incoherent state by Jane. Blut stabs Duncan with a slim knife and part of the blade snaps off on Duncan's titanium hip replacement. In anger, Blut slashes Duncan's face and stabs him in the left eye. Overnight, Duncan uses the knife shard to pick the locks on his manacles and by morning he escapes the mansion, killing many of Blut's henchmen. He travels to Jazmin, an old friend of his, who treats his wounds and supplies him with weapons.

Duncan calls Vivian and offers himself in trade for Camille, which she accepts, but on Blut's orders, she double-crosses him and arrives with Alexei and more of Blut's henchmen. Duncan gives Vivian a chance to walk away but she refuses, and he uses machine guns remote-controlled by gloves embedded with laser pointers to kill the entire force, leaving only a critically wounded Vivian.

Duncan returns to Blut's mansion, where the few remaining henchmen flee rather than face Duncan. Blut awaits Duncan alone but is decapitated. Duncan rescues Camille and returns to Montana where he treats her in her cabin.

Duncan awakens one morning in Camille's cabin to find newspaper clippings of the murder of a family many years prior spread around Camille's bed and her missing, which he recognizes as a hit that he himself carried out (albeit with bad intel), something that has haunted him ever since. The only survivor of the family was a young daughter, who grew up to be Camille. She also had managed to track him down through the money he donated to her annually via anonymous donation. He finds himself at gunpoint and explains what happened to Camille before apologizing and telling her to close her mind and pull the trigger; however, she spares him. Camille then asks Duncan if they can determine who ordered her father dead and he says they can try.

Cast

In addition, Lovina Yavari and Ayisha Issa appear as Junkie Jane and Jazmin, respectively. Canadian actor Marsha Mason plays the owner of the general store, Marsha's.

Production
The film was first announced in October 2014 as a live action adaptation of Dark Horse Comics' Polar, developed by Dark Horse Entertainment and Constantin Film. A spec script for the film by Jayson Rothwell was purchased. In October 2017, Mads Mikkelsen signed on to star in the film. In February 2018, Vanessa Hudgens, Katheryn Winnick and Matt Lucas joined the cast with Netflix onboard to distribute the film.

Filming began early February 2018 in Orono, Ontario, Canada, and continued around February 23 in Toronto, Ontario, with Swedish director Jonas Åkerlund at the helm. Among various filming locations used was the residence of musician Deadmau5, for the opening scene.

In September 2018, Deadmau5 announced that he was in the process of producing the film's original score.

Netflix started streaming the film on January 25, 2019, with Deadmau5 releasing the soundtrack on the same day.

Soundtrack
The film's soundtrack album was released by Deadmau5 on January 25, 2019, through his record label Mau5trap. The soundtrack's release details were announced on January 8, 2019, along with the film's initial trailer. A single from the soundtrack album, "Midas Heel" was released on January 11, 2019, followed by the vocal version called "Drama Free" featuring Lights which was previously released on Mau5ville: Level 2. Several tracks of the score (such as "Somb", "Wilhelm" and "End") feature elements from Deadmau5's previous tracks from his seventh studio album While(1<2), as well as two new tracks named "Nosedive" and "Camilla", the former being a remake of his unreleased track "Rio", the latter being known previously as "Suite 02".

Reception

Critical response
The website's critical consensus reads, "An action thriller starring Mads Mikkelsen as the world's most dangerous assassin should be terrifically entertaining, but Polar proves it's possible to ruin anything if you try." On Metacritic, the film has a weighted average score of 19 out of 100, based on reviews from 12 critics, indicating "overwhelming dislike".

Accolades

Future
In May 2022, The Hollywood Reporter confirmed Åkerlund will direct another film adaptation with the title of The Black Kaiser along with Rothwell returning as the writer. Mikkelsen is set to reprise his role as Duncan Vizla as well as assisting Rothwell with the writing. However, this film will neither be "a sequel or a prequel".

References

External links
 

2019 films
2019 action thriller films
Constantin Film films
Dark Horse Entertainment films
Films based on Dark Horse Comics
Films based on webcomics
Films directed by Jonas Åkerlund
Films set in 2019
Films set in Austin, Texas
Films set in Detroit
Films set in Minsk
Films set in Chile
Films set in Montana
Films set in Miami
Films set in New Jersey
Films set in Seattle
Live-action films based on comics
English-language Netflix original films
English-language German films
American neo-noir films
American action thriller films
2010s English-language films
2010s American films